Sammy Stewart (born 1 March 1991 in Portadown, Northern Ireland) is a Northern Irish professional football player currently without a club after being released by Cowdenbeath.

Career

Glenavon
Stewart started his career with the Irish Premier League side Glenavon in 2007.

Aberdeen
In May 2008, Stewart signed a two-year deal with Scottish Premier League side Aberdeen. after the club buying him for a reported £15,000 from Glenavon FC.
He scored his first goal for The Dons in a friendly against Inverurie on 5 August 2008.

His first (and only) competitive appearance for Aberdeen was on 24 May 2009, when he replaced Sone Aluko in the last game of the season against Hibernian.

On 5 January 2010, he was released by Aberdeen by mutual consent.

Return to Glenavon
In August 2010, Stewart returned to Glenavon, signing a one-year deal.

Lisburn Distillery & Portadown
Stewart then had a spell at Lisburn Distillery and played for Mid-Ulster Football League club Ambassadors Fc, before signing for Portadown.

Cowdenbeath
On 31 January 2014, Stewart signed for Scottish Championship club Cowdenbeath. Stewart was released by the club at the end of the season.

Personal life
His brother Thomas plays for Shamrock Rovers and Johnny, a pacy midfielder, plays for Ambassadors FC in Northern Ireland and is known to have rejected a move to Bayern Munich as 
a schoolboy. Upon leaving Ambassadors FC, whom he played for in Northern Ireland's Midulster league, he was replaced by boyhood friend Alan Whitman.

References

External links
 
 
 NIFG profile

Living people
1991 births
Association footballers from Northern Ireland
Glenavon F.C. players
Aberdeen F.C. players
Lisburn Distillery F.C. players
Portadown F.C. players
Cowdenbeath F.C. players
People from Craigavon, County Armagh
Scottish Premier League players
People educated at Portadown College
Association football midfielders